The 2017–18 East Midlands Counties Football League season was the 10th in the history of East Midlands Counties Football League, a football competition in England at level 10 of the English football league system.

League

The league featured 19 clubs from the previous season, along with three new clubs:
Clifton All Whites, promoted from the Nottinghamshire Senior League
Selston, promoted from the Central Midlands Football League
Teversal, transferred from the Northern Counties East League

League table

Stadia and locations

References

External links
 East Midlands Counties Football League

2017-18
10